John Fletcher Lacey (May 30, 1841 – September 29, 1913) was an eight-term Republican United States congressman from Iowa's 6th congressional district.  He was also the author of the Lacey Act of 1900, which made it a crime to ship illegal game across state lines, and the Lacey Act of 1907, which further regulated the handling of tribal funds. As the first federal conservation law, the Lacey Act of 1900 remains one of the foundations of conservation law enforcement.

Background and Civil War service
Lacey was born in New Martinsville, Virginia (now West Virginia). He moved to Iowa in 1855 with his parents, who settled in Oskaloosa. He attended the common schools and pursued classical studies.  He also engaged in agricultural pursuits, and learned the trades of bricklaying and plastering.

In the spring of 1861, when Lacey was twenty years old, the American Civil War began.  Lacey joined an infantry in the Union Army in May 1861. He initially enlisted in Company H, 3rd Iowa Volunteer Infantry Regiment. During his time with the Third Iowa Infantry, he was captured at the Battle of Blue Mills.  However, he was soon released on parole. He afterward served as sergeant major in Company D, 33rd Iowa Volunteer Infantry Regiment. He was promoted to lieutenant and reassigned to Company C of that regiment, then promoted to assistant adjutant general on the staff of General Frederick Steele. He remained in this position until the end of the war.

As the war concluded, he studied law, was admitted to the bar in 1865, and began to practice law in Oskaloosa.  Five years later, he became a member of the Iowa House of Representatives. He was elected to the Iowa House of Representatives for a term beginning in 1870. He was later elected to the Oskaloosa City Council in 1880, serving until 1883. He served one term as city solicitor.

On April 12, 1902, Lacey accepted membership into the Boone and Crockett Club, a wildlife conservation organization founded by Theodore Roosevelt in 1887.

Congressional service

In 1888, he was nominated by the Republican Party to challenge incumbent Greenback Party Congressman James Weaver, who was seeking re-election to his fourth term as representative of Iowa's 6th congressional district.  Lacey unseated Weaver.   Lacey served one term (as a member of the Fifty-first United States Congress), but was defeated in the 1890 Democratic landslide by Democrat Frederick Edward White.  Two years later, however, Lacey reclaimed his seat from White, and served seven consecutive terms, as a member of the Fifty-third through the Fifty-ninth Congresses. He served twelve years as the chairman of the Committee on Public Lands, in the Fifty-fourth through Fifty-ninth Congresses.  However, in 1906, when running for a ninth term, Lacey was unseated by Democrat Daniel W. Hamilton.

After leaving Congress, Lacey practiced law until his death in Oskaloosa on September 29, 1913.

The Lacey Act of 1894
Congressman Lacey was an enthusiastic defender of Yellowstone National Park and in 1894, in response to the inability of park administrators to punish poachers of the park's wildlife, Lacey sponsored legislation to give the Department of Interior authority arrest and prosecute law violators in the park.
Although only known as the Lacey Act in the context of Yellowstone National Park, in May 1894 congress passed An Act To protect the birds and animals in Yellowstone National Park, and to punish crimes in said park, and for other purposes. which became the cornerstone of future law enforcement policies in the park.

The Lacey Act of 1900
Today, Lacey is most prominently known as the namesake of the Lacey Act of 1900. The Act, which is codified in as amended at 16 U.S.C. §§ 3371-3378, protects both plants and wildlife by creating civil and criminal penalties for a wide array of violations.  Most notably, the Act prohibits trade in wildlife, fish, and plants that have been illegally taken, possessed, transported or sold.    Congressman Lacey introduced the bill in the spring of 1900.  It was signed into law on May 25, 1900 by President William McKinley after passing both houses of Congress.

The Lacey Act of 1907
Another major legislative initiative—also known as "The Lacey Act," but approved in the lame duck session after his 1906 defeat and signed into law in his final week in Congress—made provision for the allotment of tribal funds to certain classes of Indians. These provisions were proposed after the passage of the Burke Act and the Dawes Act, both of which provided for the allotment of reservation lands to individual Indians, but not to communally owned trust funds. After much debate and several opposing arguments, President Theodore Roosevelt signed the bill into law on March 2, 1907.

The Antiquities Act
Lacey is also significant in the history of the conservation movement for his role in writing (with the help of anthropologist Edgar Lee Hewett) and enacting the Antiquities Act.  The act has been pivotal to the preservation of major archaeological sites in the Southwestern United States.

References

 Prucha, Francis Paul. 'Documents of United States Indian Policy: Third Edition'. University of Nebraska Press. Lincoln, Nebraska. 2000. Pg. 208
 John Fletcher LACEY — Infoplease.com at www.infoplease.com
 The Lacey Act: America's Premier Weapon at www.animallaw.info
 FAQs for Indian Tribal Governments regarding Miscellaneous Issues at www.irs.gov

External links
 
 Richard West Sellars, "A Very Large Array: Early Federal Historic Preservation--The Antiquities Act, Mesa Verde, and the National Park Service Act"(background information on John F. Lacey, and legislative history) published by the University of New Mexico School of Law, 2007.
 Retrieved on 2008-11-01

1841 births
1913 deaths
Republican Party members of the Iowa House of Representatives
Iowa lawyers
National Park Service
People from New Martinsville, West Virginia
People from Oskaloosa, Iowa
People of Iowa in the American Civil War
Union Army generals
Iowa city council members
Republican Party members of the United States House of Representatives from Iowa
19th-century American politicians
19th-century American lawyers